Lane Community College is a public community college in Eugene, Oregon, with additional facilities in downtown Eugene, Florence, Cottage Grove, and the Lane Aviation Academy at Eugene Airport.  Lane serves more than 26,000 credit and non-credit students annually in a 5,000 square-mile (~8047 km2) service district, including most of Lane County as well as individual school districts in Benton, Linn, and Douglas counties.

History 

In 1964 Lane County citizens voted overwhelmingly to establish Lane as a comprehensive community college (approving it 5,944 to 1,282). The new college was able to build upon successful traditions of the Eugene Vocational School, which had been established in 1938 to provide manual education and training to high school students and unemployed adults.

Lane, 1964-1989 
Lane's first board of education met in November 1964, with an agenda to hire faculty and staff, create curriculum, and find classroom and office space. The college became a member of the American Association of Community and Junior Colleges in August 1965.  According to the college's narrative history, "The first classes were held on September 20, 1965, at facilities at 200 North Monroe in Eugene. During that first year 1,500 students registered at the college."

Oregon's Governor Mark Hatfield presented the college charter in October 1965, and voters passed a 5-year serial levy to support initial construction. Oregon Senator Wayne L. Morse presided as keynote speaker at the groundbreaking in January 1967. Local resident Wilfred Gonyea had donated 105.81 acres off 30th Avenue in 1965 for the main campus, and added more acreage in 1967. Two other residents, Joe Romania and Lew Williams, donated additional land for the campus in 1972, the same year Mr. and Mrs. James Christensen donated land south of Florence for a facility there.

In 1966 voters had passed a $9.6 million bond to construct the main campus in southeast Eugene, where classes began two years later. In May 1968, voters approved a $1.5 million permanent real estate tax base for operating costs, continuing the county's widespread support for the college. Oregon Governor Tom McCall opened the new campus in 1969 by cutting a log with a chainsaw.

Lane became a founding member of the League for Innovation in the Community College in 1973.

Centers in Florence and Cottage Grove opened in 1976 and 1977. The college purchased land in 1983 to permanently house the Cottage Grove center.

In 1979, Lane College was the host of the USA Cross Country Championships.

Lane, 1990-present 
Oregon voters passed Measure 5 capping property taxes in 1990. That same election, Lane County voters approved a new property tax base for Lane Community College. Because the statewide measure would "equalize" funding for Oregon's community colleges, the resulting funding uncertainties presented a dilemma Community College Commissioner Mike Holland called "a cosmic joke." The College eventually lobbied successfully for its new tax base, and envisioned a return to better times, but President Jerry Moskus observed, "there were signs neither Lane nor Oregon would ever be the same."

The northern spotted owl controversy and the nationwide recession of the early 1990s brought displaced timber workers to the College, after the dire 1992 forecast of a crippling recession in which President George Bush predicted, "we'll be up to our neck in owls, and every millworker will be out of a job." The New York Times reported, "At Lane Community College, the nation's largest center for retraining displaced woodworkers, nearly 9 of every 10 people going through the program have found new jobs, at an average wage of $9.02 an hour, about $1 an hour less than the average timber industry wage."

By 2002, years of state funding shortfalls and enrollment growth required drastic action to reduce the College budget by 7 percent. The college eliminated seven degree and certificate programs, and raised tuition by $10 per credit, a 26 percent increase. In succeeding years, some personnel layoffs were avoided by leaving vacant positions unfilled, but there were also reductions in classified staff.

Even though the College successfully invested capital funds in new construction and renovations in the first decade of this millennium, the operating budget has continued to be a challenge. The College predicted the shortfall for fiscal year 2015 to be $12.7 million, according to a local newspaper, "after a precipitous enrollment drop. The student body grew by 40 percent during the Great Recession and has retreated sharply since." In May 2014, a 5 percent tuition increase was approved to meet the deficit, meaning tuition increased 172 percent since 2000 — from $36 per credit to $98 per credit.

Compounding the 2015 budget challenges, the federal loan default rate of ex-LCC students approached 30 percent in 2013, the threshold that could cause the federal government to "bar LCC students from getting federal grants." Approximately 73 percent of Lane's students take out student loans.

Organization and administration 
Lane is governed by a Board of Education consisting of seven publicly elected, unpaid members who have responsibility for establishing policies and overseeing programs and services of the college. Lane is one of seventeen Oregon community colleges authorized by the Oregon legislature and regulated by the Oregon Office of Community Colleges and Workforce Development.

Academics

Lane Community College offers two-year transfer Associate degrees, career-technical applied associate degrees and certificates, and pre-college classes that focus on reading, writing, mathematics, and study skills.

State-approved programs offer students preparation for employment in approximately 50 career areas: health careers such as nursing and paramedicine, flight technology, culinary arts and hotel and restaurant management, auto and diesel mechanics, manufacturing, business and computer careers, graphic design and multimedia careers, exercise science, as well as criminal justice and human relations careers.

Green career programs at Lane include watershed science, water conservation, energy management, renewable energy and sustainability.

English as a second language non-credit courses are offered in listening, speaking, reading and writing. Adult basic skills classes target students who have not earned high school diplomas with preparation for the test of General Education Development (GED). Other non-credit courses include topics for lifelong learning, including some career classes, health and safety courses, as well as business development classes, employee training and professional development.

Since 2009, Lane has joined multiple national and international efforts to improve student learning, retention, progression, and completion: Achieving the Dream, Degree Qualifications Profile, Association of American Colleges and Universities Roadmaps, Foundations of Excellence, The Democracy Commitment, Next Generation Learning Challenges, and Project Win-Win. For its promising results in improving developmental English completion rates, Lane was named one of 16 community colleges in the 2014 national cohort of "Leader Colleges" by Achieving the Dream.

TRiO and TRiO STEM are a programs funded by the US Department of Education Division of Special Services, Title IV, Higher Education Act 1964. Assistance provided to students includes tutoring and resources such as books, computers, as well as a clean and safe space to do homework assignments. TRiO programs offer a strong support network of staff and fellow students who  prepare students for challenges of university life, emphasizing organizational skills, time management, balancing home and school life, and maintaining strong relationships with instructors and professors.

Accreditation
Lane is accredited by the Northwest Commission on Colleges and Universities (NWCCU). Individual career programs are also recognized and accredited by career and vocational associations.

Following an October 2014 site visit, accreditors made seven recommendations for improvement which the local newspaper characterized as "meta-problems: not problems with what LCC is doing, but problems with how LCC measures what it does." In February, 2018 NWCCU provided the college with a letter, noting status on recommendations and removing warnings from the site visit.

Students 
Of the more than 26,000 students attending Lane during academic year 2016-17, 62 percent were in credit programs and 38 percent were in non-credit classes. Approximately 46 percent of credit students attended full-time and 54 percent attended part-time.

The average age of credit students in Fall 2016 was 25.4 years, and the average age of non-credit students was 43.3 years. Credit female students outnumbered males by 51 percent to 49 percent, and in non-credit courses, by 56 percent to 33 percent (11 percent did not select a gender). 72 percent of Lane credit students self-reported as Caucasian. Hispanic students represented 14 percent of credit students; multiracial students represented over 7 percent; Asian students represented 3 percent; Asian/Pacific Islanders represented 1 percent; Native American students represented 3 percent and African American students represented 2 percent.

In December 2010, the school became the second community college in the United States to open a tribal longhouse, after Peninsula College, which opened its longhouse in 2007. The college has over 650 American Indian students, and annually hosts one of the largest powwows in the Pacific Northwest. Since 2006, the College has offered two years of Chinuk WaWa language study that satisfy second-language graduation requirements of Oregon public universities.

Campuses

The main campus is located in central Lane County between south Eugene and Springfield, just west of I-5.  It consists of 25 main classroom buildings and numerous secondary buildings in the Brutalist style of architecture.

Lane's main campus is fully accessible for wheelchairs and the mobility impaired, and a network of concrete bridges connect neighboring buildings. Athletic facilities such as the track, soccer field, and baseball field cover the north side of the campus, while parking lots surround the campus buildings on the other three sides. Adjacent to the west parking lot, a courtyard that once contained a large concrete fountain has been converted into a flat maze garden, with native plants surrounding a small stone fountain in the center. The west and south sides of campus consist of evergreen forest, including walking trails used for physical education and biology classes.

Lane also has learning centers in downtown Eugene, Cottage Grove, and Florence, as well as facilities at the Eugene airport for the Lane Aviation Academy.

The Mary Spilde Center, formerly the LCC Downtown Center, at the corner of 10th Avenue and Olive Street, across from the Eugene Public Library, includes classroom space designed as a laboratory for Energy Management and Reusable Energy degree programs, as well as student housing in Titan Court.

The Cottage Grove Learning Center at 1275 S. River Road offers credit general education transfer and college preparatory classes, non-credit adult basic skills and GED classes, as well as continuing education classes.

The Florence Center at 3149 Oak Street offers credit general education classes in 80 different disciplines, all necessary courses for several transfer associate degrees,  as well as some nursing classes. Community Education classes in Florence include a variety of enrichment classes and professional development courses.

The Lane Aviation Academy at the Eugene airport houses programs in Flight Technology (commercial, corporate and private pilot training) and Aviation Maintenance (service and repair a variety of aircraft).

New construction and renovation 
The college has undertaken multiple major construction projects since 1995, some supported by Lane County votes for construction bonds: 
 In 1995, a $42.8 million bond measure supported renovation of multiple buildings on the main campus and at Cottage Grove and Florence, updating technology infrastructure, as well as constructing learning centers at Willamette High School, Oakridge High school, Churchill High School, McKenzie High School, Elmira High School, and Junction City High School. The bond construction also included new classroom and laboratory space, in the Center for Meeting and Learning.
 Voters approved an $83 million bond measure  in 2008 to address aging infrastructure issues, and to update instructional facilities, equipment and technology.  
  In February 2009, the state awarded capital construction funds of $8 million in economic stimulus funding for deferred maintenance.   
 Lane Foundation's first-ever capital campaign in 2009, state matching funds and additional Kresge grant funding totaled $23 million, supporting construction of a 43,554 square-foot Health and Wellness building, a scholarship endowment and an innovation fund.  
 A 6,720 square-foot Native American Longhouse was added in the fall of 2010, with seed funds of $100,000 from the Spirit Mountain Community Fund, $250,000 from Lane's board, and donations from the community.  
 A new $53 million Downtown Center includes a LEED Platinum academic building and a LEED Gold student housing building. The solar power station at the center was supported by a $100,000 grant from the Eugene Water and Electric Board.  
 The college finished a $35 million bond construction-and-renovation of the Center Building on the 30th Avenue Campus in 2016 to remove the concrete walkways around it, create a new food court and bookstore, and remodel classroom and office space

Not all the construction projects have been successes. The six high school Learning Centers built with the 1995 bond funds were eventually closed for budgetary reasons and the buildings donated to the partner high schools. The electric car charging station built in 2010 had to be scaled back by half, but the $675,000 cost was still criticized because of the small number of electric vehicles currently on the road.

Green construction efforts at Lane have otherwise been viewed positively. The new Health and Wellness building and the Downtown Center are both LEED certified. President Spilde received the 2013 Green Schools President's Award from the US Green Building Schools, for being "a national leader in 'greening' the college environment and developing the entire campus as a 'learning lab' for student instruction."

Public radio station
The public radio station KLCC began broadcasting in February 1967. Lane Community College owns the license for NPR affiliate KLCC. KLCC broadcasts at 89.7 FM in Eugene and on various repeater frequencies, serving 88,000 listeners each week in Western and Central Oregon. KLCC offers NPR News, local news, and an eclectic music blend. KLCC airs NPR's All Things Considered, Morning Edition and Weekend Edition,  along with Wait, Wait, Don't Tell Me, and other news and talk shows.  On weekends KLCC airs a mix of music shows including jazz, blues, folk, Americana, Celtic and world music.

In popular culture 

Getting Straight, starring Elliott Gould and Candice Bergen, was filmed at Lane in 1969. As the campus was still under construction at the time, the "occupation scenes" were easier to shoot.

The Grateful Dead performed a concert on campus as a benefit for the college and White Bird Clinic on January 22, 1971, drawing a crowd of approximately 7,000 fans.

In January 1996, KLCC reporter Alan Siporin covered the arrival of Keiko, the orca of Free Willy  fame, at his new home in the Newport Oregon Coast Aquarium for National Public Radio and the Discovery Channel.

In August 1996, Warner Bros. shot a scene for the film Prefontaine at Lane because the track's black surface fit the "vintage" time period of the 70s. The track was upgraded weeks later, and resurfaced in blue.

The college maintains the David Joyce Gallery, which displays rotating local artwork in the Center for Meeting and Learning. In 2015, the gallery became the temporary home for Flight Patterns, an installation originally designed by David Joyce for the Eugene Airport.

See also 
 List of Oregon community colleges

References

External links
Official website
Official athletics website

 
Education in Eugene, Oregon
Community colleges in Oregon
Universities and colleges accredited by the Northwest Commission on Colleges and Universities
Buildings and structures in Eugene, Oregon
Education in Lane County, Oregon
Cross country running courses in Oregon
1964 establishments in Oregon